WPBX (99.3 FM, "Mix 99.3") is a radio station broadcasting an adult contemporary music format. Licensed to Crossville, Tennessee, United States, the station is currently owned by Peg Broadcasting, LLC and features programming from Compass Media Networks and United Stations Radio Networks.

References

External links

PBX
Mainstream adult contemporary radio stations in the United States
Cumberland County, Tennessee